{{Automatic taxobox
|image = Snail Pigeon House Mountain.jpg
|image_caption = Helicarion mastersi
|display_parents = 3
|taxon = Helicarion
|authority = Férussac, 1821<ref>Férussac A. É. d'A. de (1821). Tableaux Systematiques des Animaux Mollusques: suivis d'un prodrome général pour tous les mollusques terrestres ou fluviatiles vivantes ou fossiles. Paris, Bertrand xlvii, 114 pp., Tabl. gén., xxxi.</ref>
|synonyms=
 Helecarion Férussac, 1821 (misspelling of original genus name, Helicarion Férussac, 1821)
 Helicarion (Helicarion) Férussac, 1821
 Helixarion Férussac, 1821 (incorrect original spelling)
}}Helicarion is a genus of air-breathing land snails or semislugs, terrestrial pulmonate gastropod mollusks in the family Helicarionidae. Helicarion is the type genus of the family Helicarionidae.

Species
Species within the genus Helicarion include:
 Helicarion altitudinis Pilsbry, 1934
 Helicarion australis Reeve, 1862
 Helicarion castanea (Pfeiffer, 1853)
 Helicarion cuvieri Férussac, 1821 - type species
 Helicarion mastersi Cox, 1868
 Helicarion melanesicus I. Rensch, 1932
 Helicarion perfragilis Möllendorff, 1897  (taxon inquirendum)
 Helicarion schneideri I. Rensch, 1932
 Helicarion willeyana Godwin-Austen, 1903
Species brought into synonymy
 Helicarion leopardina Iredale, 1941: synonym of Helicarion cuvieri Férussac, 1821
 Helicarion porrectusIredale, 1941: syno,nym of Mysticarion porrectus Iredale, 1941
 Helicarion rubicundus (Dartnall & Kershaw, 1978) was moved to the monotypic genus Attenborougharion'' in 2017

References

External links
 Férussac, A.E.J.P.F. d'Audebard de. (1821-1822). Tableaux systématiques des animaux mollusques classés en familles naturelles, dans lesquels on a établi la concordance de tous les systèmes; suivis d'un Prodrome général pour tous les mollusques ou fluviatiles, vivantes ou fossiles. Paris, 1821 et 1822. Livraison 9: 1-24
 Hyman, I. T.; Köhler, F. (2018). Reconciling comparative anatomy and mitochondrial phylogenetics in revising species limits in the Australian semislug Helicarion Férussac, 1821 (Gastropoda: Stylommatophora). Zoological Journal of the Linnean Society.
 Godwin-Austen H.H. (1882-1920). Land and freshwater Mollusca of India, including South Arabia, Baluchistan, Afghanistan, Kashmir, Nepal, Burmah, Pegu, Tenasserim, Malay Peninsula, Ceylon, and other islands of the Indian Ocean. Supplementary to Messrs. Theobald and Hanley's Conchologia Indica. London, Taylor & Francis.

Helicarionidae
Taxonomy articles created by Polbot